Henry "Harry" Burrows (born 17 March 1941) is an English former professional footballer who played in the Football League for Aston Villa, Plymouth Argyle and Stoke City.

Career
Burrows was born in Haydock and attracted the attentions of First Division clubs, Burnley, Liverpool, and Aston Villa whilst playing for Wigan Boys. He turned them all down including an offer from Stan Cullis at Wolverhampton Wanderers instead turning his attentions on becoming an apprentice with the National Coal Board (NCB). Villa manager Joe Mercer persuaded Burrows to sign part-time in March 1958 and he made his debut in 1959–60 as Villa won the Second Division title. He played and scored in the final of the inaugural League Cup in 1961 as Villa beat Rotherham United 3–2. Burrows won an England U23 cap against Greece and finished as Villa's top goalscorer in 1961–62 and 1962–63, although the departure of Mercer ended a golden period in Villa's history. The signings of new manager Dick Taylor all earned a higher basic wage then the existing Villa players which caused friction and one by one the players departed and Villa would end up languishing in the Third Division.

Burrows was a highly prized asset at Villa Park and his transfer to Stoke City for £27,000 on transfer deadline day in March 1965 was seen as a coup for Tony Waddington. His infamous 'cannonball' like shot soon made him a terrace favourite at the Victoria Ground. He scored 17 goals in 1966–67 as Stoke let a good start to the season come to nothing and they finished in 12th place. He was joined top league goalscorer in 1967–68 with 15 goals as Stoke finished 18th. He top scored again in 1969–70 with 14 and played 45 games in 1970–71 as Stoke lost out to Arsenal in the FA Cup semi-final. Injuries led to Burrows being released on a free transfer in the summer of 1973 and signed for Plymouth Argyle. He helped Argyle gain promotion to the Second Division in 1974–75 but with his knee still causing him trouble he decided to retire.

Style of play
Burrows could play in all forward positions but was most regularly played as an out and out winger. He was renowned for his pace and powerful left foot shot.

Post-retirement
On his retirement Burrows returned to Staffordshire and ran a carpet business, a pub and a post office and occasionally turned out in charity matches. Burrows lived for a number of years in the Staffordshire village of Abbots Bromley where he is still the president of the local football club, the Abbots Bromley Stags.

Career statistics
Source:

Honours
 Aston Villa
 Football League Second Division champions: 1959–60
 Football League Cup winner: 1961

References

External links
 

1941 births
Living people
Association football forwards
Aston Villa F.C. players
Cleveland Stokers players
England under-23 international footballers
English expatriate footballers
English expatriate sportspeople in the United States
English Football League players
English footballers
Expatriate soccer players in the United States
Footballers from St Helens, Merseyside
People from Abbots Bromley
Plymouth Argyle F.C. players
Stoke City F.C. players
United Soccer Association players